Chitaadantha is a novel by Kannada writer K. N. Ganeshaiah, published by Ankita Pustaka, Bangalore in the year 2010. The book has a story surrounded by Alexander the Great's India visit and Buddhism in India. The story permeates from BC to modern times, a group searching for hidden wealth and experts and scientists studying about it.

References

Kannada novels